Jongkhar is a small town in southern Bhutan near the border with India.

Transport 

The nearest railway is about 30 km away over the border.

See also 

 List of railway stations in Bhutan

References 

Populated places in Bhutan